Vir is a genus of shrimp comprising the following species:

Vir colemani Bruce, 2003
Vir euphyllius Marin & Anker, 2005
Vir longidactylusa Marin, 2008
Vir orientalis (Dana, 1852)
Vir philippinensis Bruce & Svoboda, 1984
Vir smiti Fransen & Holthuis, 2007

References

Palaemonoidea